The 42nd German Skeleton Championship in 2008 was organized on 4 and 5 January in Altenberg.

Men

Women

External links
 Results (ladies)
 Results (men)

Skeleton championships in Germany
2008 in German sport
2008 in skeleton
Sport in Altenberg, Saxony
2000s in Saxony